Beneath My Wheels is Kevin Welch's fourth solo album. This was Welch's second album for Dead Reckoning Records, which he co-founded in 1994 with fellow musicians Kieran Kane, Mike Henderson, Tammy Rogers, and Harry Stinson.

Critical reception

Heather Phares of AllMusic writes, "Kevin Welch's fourth album, Beneath My Wheels features more of the expansive songwriting for which he has become known in alt country and folk circles."

Brian Baker of Country Standard Time writes, "Most amazing is the sonic consistency of the disc, recorded over a long stretch of time and in a number of locales with different sets of musicians."

Geoffrey Hines of The Washington Post begins his review with, "Kevin Welch is such a great singer that even his weaker songs sound good."

CD Shakedown begins a review of the album with, "After a four-year absence from the recording studio, singer Kevin Welch returns with the beautiful and somber, Beneath My Wheels."

No Depression concludes their review with, "Welch has finally produced the masterpiece he’s long had in him. Beneath My Wheels is full of uncommon musical variety and starkly beautiful images that resonate long after the disc has finished playing."

Track listing

Musicians
Kevin Welch: Vocals, Acoustic Guitar
Mike Henderson: Electric Guitar
Frank Birck Pontoppidan: Electric Guitar
Kieran Kane: Octave Mandolin
Fats Kaplin: Violin, Accordion, Pedal Steel
Charlie White: Bass, Guitar, Harmonica, Tambourine, Background Vocals
Gustav Ljunggren: Keyboards
Glenn Worf: Bass
Henrik Schou Poulsen: Bass
Harry Stinson: Drums, Hand Drums, Shaker, Background Vocals
Frank Marstokk: Drums
Phil Jones: Percussion, Tambourine
Tony Harrell: Organ
Sandy Bull: Sarod
Byron House: Banjo
Gillian Welch: Background Vocals
David Rawlings: Background Vocals
Bekka Bramlett: Background Vocals
Isaac Freeman: Background Vocals
Joseph Rice: Background Vocals

Production
Kevin Welch: Producer
Frank Marstokk: Producer
Peter Coleman: Engineer, Mixing
Charlie White: Producer, Mixing, Overdub Engineer
Teis Frandsen: Engineer
Bob Etherington: Engineer
Philip Scoggins: Engineer, Mixing, Overdub Engineer, Vocal Engineer
Jason Breckling: Assistant Engineer, Mixing Assistant
Dan Lefler: Assistant Engineer
Phil Jones: Mixing, Overdub Engineer
Mills Logan: Editing
Angela Haglund: Design
Señor McGuire: Photography

All track information and credits were taken from the CD liner notes.

References

1999 albums
Dead Reckoning Records albums